The Committee for Finance is a Northern Ireland Assembly committee established to advise, assist and scrutinise the work of the Department of Finance and Minister for Finance.  The committee also plays a key role in the consultation, consideration and development of new  legislation.

Until 2016, the committee was called the Committee for Finance and Personnel.

Membership (9)

Chairpersons

See also 
 Committee

References

External links 
 Committee for Finance and Personnel

Northern Ireland Assembly
Committees